Ecco the Dolphin is a series of action-adventure video games developed by Appaloosa Interactive (previously known as Novotrade International) and published by Sega. They were originally developed for the Mega Drive/Genesis and Dreamcast video game consoles, and have been ported to numerous systems. The story follows the eponymous Ecco, a bottlenose dolphin, who fights extraterrestrial threats to the world. The games are known for their high difficulty level. Ecco was created by Ed Annunziata, who also produced Chakan: The Forever Man, which was also released in December 1992.

Games

Ecco the Dolphin

Released in 1992, the original game followed the exploits of a young dolphin named Ecco as he searches the seas, and eventually time itself, for his missing pod.

Ecco: The Tides of Time

Released in 1994, the sequel follows Ecco's exploits after the conclusion of the original game as he travels the oceans, the past, and the future in his quest to save the planet once more.

Ecco Jr.

Released in 1995, this title was intended as edutainment and lacked the sophistication and difficulty of the previous two titles in series.
When Ecco and his friends find out Big Blue, a wise and famous whale, is nearby, they must do favors and break crystals in order to pass the stage and find him.

Ecco Jr. and the Great Ocean Treasure Hunt
Released in 1995, an edutainment game similar to Ecco Jr. on the Sega Genesis, this title was released on the Sega Pico. In this game, Ecco and his friends explore the ocean and the ruins that lie within to find various treasures. This game distinguishes itself by utilizing stylus control for the gameplay.

Ecco the Dolphin: Defender of the Future

Released in 2000 for the Dreamcast and later ported to PlayStation 2, this title re-envisions the Ecco mythos in a new Earth with a new premise.

Ecco II: Sentinels of the Universe (cancelled)

A sequel to Defender of the Future was in development in 2001, but was cancelled due to the decline of the Dreamcast. A playable build of the game was leaked online in 2016.

Ports and related media
Ecco the Dolphin and Ecco: The Tides of Time were both re-released for the Sega CD, Master System and Game Gear, and Defender of the Future was originally released for the Dreamcast and later re-released for the PlayStation 2. The Sega CD version of Ecco the Dolphin was ported to Microsoft Windows in 1995. Ecco the Dolphin was also re-released on the Game Boy Advance as part of the fourth Sega Smash Pack. All of the Mega Drive games have been released on Valve's Steam platform, as well as being ported to Nintendo's Virtual Console and the first game was ported to Microsoft's Xbox Live Arcade.

Two six-part comic book series of Ecco the Dolphin stories based on the first game were featured in Sonic the Comic. Series one was written by Woodrow Phoenix and drawn by Chris Webster in 1993. Series two followed in 1995.

Legal dispute and after
In late 2016 series creator Ed Annunziata reached a settlement with Sega regarding the legal rights to the franchise. The attempt to regain the intellectual property rights, in part, arose from Annunziata's unsuccessful attempt to make a spiritual successor called The Big Blue funded through Kickstarter which could not use the Ecco name. Although the exact details of the settlement were unclear, it was believed by media outlets including Venture Beat that it could pave the way for a new installment in the franchise by Annunziata. Soon thereafter Annunziata himself talked about wanting to revive the series for the Nintendo Switch.

Soundtrack

Ecco: Songs of Time is a soundtrack album which contains the original soundtrack from the Sega CD versions of Ecco the Dolphin and Ecco: The Tides of Time. It was released on September 3, 1996. The music is composed by Spencer Nilsen. The music is atmospheric and ambient, heavy on high-quality synthesizer, low-frequency percussion and various samples, including dolphin squeaks and squeals.

Track listing
Tracks 1–11 from Ecco: The Tides of Time, tracks 12–18 from Ecco the Dolphin

See also

 Chuck Person's Eccojams Vol. 1

References

 
Sega Games franchises
Video game franchises introduced in 1992